, is a third-sector Japanese railway company whose major shareholders include the Fukushima prefectural and Aizuwakamatsu city governments. It owns and operates its only line, the Aizu Railway Aizu Line. 

The names of the company and the line are from the Aizu area of Fukushima Prefecture that the line serves.

History

 June 22, 1984 - The Aizu line is opened by Japanese National Railways.
 November 10, 1986 - Aizu Railway Co., Ltd. is established.
 1987:
 -Route name, new station name, company badge, etc. are determined.
 July 16 - East Japan Railway (JR East) to convert the Aizu line Aizusen opening  .
 April 27, 1988 - To-no-Hetsuri Station opens.
With this electrification, through services begin with the Tobu Kinugawa Line, Tobu Nikko Line, and the Tobu Isesaki Line.
 August 10, 1995 - Minami-Wakamatsu Station opens.
 August 7, 1999 - Amaya Station was opened.
 July 18, 2001 - Aizu-Sanson-Dojo Station opens.
 2002
 March 23 - Aizu Mount Express begins operation.
 August 29 - Furusato-Koen Station opens.
 March 1, 2005 - The express "Minamiaizu" was abolished. Aizu Mount Express starts direct operation to Kinugawa Onsen Station on the Tobu Kinugawa Line.
 March 18, 2006 - Aizu Kogen Station was renamed to Aizu Kogen Ozeguchi Station.
 2009:
 April 18 - A concert is held outside Yunokami-Onsen station
 August 23-24 - Rokujizo Station temporarily opens.
 August 23, 24, 2010- Ichinoseiroku Jizoson Station was temporarily opened, in the same location as Rokujizo station the previous year. This station would be opened every year until 2014.
 2012:
 March 17 - Aizu Mount Express begins direct operation to Tobu-Nikko Station.
 March 25-The Yume Tour begins operating to Kinugawa-Onsen Station on the Tobu Kinugawa Line.
 April 21, 2017 - Tobu's limited express Liberty Aizu starts operations to Aizu-Tajima Station.

Ridership

See also

 Rail transport in Japan
 Aizu Line, the sole line operated by the company

References

Railway companies of Japan
Rail transport in Fukushima Prefecture
Japanese third-sector railway lines